Darren McCormack (born 29 July 1978) is an Irish hurler who played as a centre-back for the Westmeath senior team.

Born in Castlepollard, County Westmeath, McCormack first arrived on the inter-county scene at the age of seventeen when he first linked up with the Westmeath minor teams as a dual player before later joining the under-21 hurling side. He made his senior debut during the 1997 league. McCormack subsequently became a regular member of the starting fifteen and won three Christy Ring Cup medals.

As a member of the Leinster inter-provincial team on a number of occasions, McCormack won one Railway Cup medal. At club level he is a four-time championship medallist with Castlepollard.

McCormack announced his retirement from inter-county hurling on 24 May 2012.

Honours
Castlepollard
Westmeath Senior Hurling Championship (4): 1995, 1997, 2003, 2005

Westmeath
Christy Ring Cup (3): 2005, 2007, 2010

References

1978 births
Living people
Castlepollard hurlers
Dual players
Irish plumbers
Leinster inter-provincial hurlers
Westmeath inter-county hurlers
Westmeath Gaelic footballers